2010 census may refer to:

 2010 Chinese Census
 2010 Dominican Republic Census
 2010 Indonesian census
 2010 Malaysian Census
 2010 Russian Census
 2010 Turkish census
 2010 United States Census
 2010 Zambian census